Penn Hill is an electoral ward of Poole in Dorset, England, bordering on Branksome Park, Canford Cliffs, Sandbanks, Lilliput and Parkstone. It is effectively part of Parkstone.

Overview
 11,355 people live in Penn Hill.
 There are 4,528 dwellings in the ward.
 2% of the residents are from minority ethnic groups.
 26.52% of the people are between the ages of 40 and 59.
 There are 2947 people over the age of 60 living in this ward.
 82.53% of residents own their own homes, either outright or with a mortgage.
 12.50% of residents live in privately rented homes.
 3.98% of residents live in council or housing association homes.
 0.99% of residents live completely rent free.
 The population density of Penn Hill is approximately 7604 people per square mile (2936/km2).
 The actual size of the ward is 1.4 square miles (3.6 km2).
 The biggest employers of men in this area (with 17.06% of males) are the real estate business and services industries.
 The biggest employers of women in this area (with 22.28% of females) are the health and social work sectors.

Politics 
Penn Hill ward for the Bournemouth, Christchurch and Poole Council

Poole (UK Parliament constituency)

References

External links
2001 Census statistics for Penn Hill

Areas of Poole